Wormy Hillock Henge, also known as The Dragon's Grave, is a small henge in Aberdeenshire, Scotland. It is a Scheduled Ancient Monument located in the Clashindarroch Forest. There is one gap in the bank at the southeast end of the henge.

History
In 1891, James Macdonald, thinking that this mound was a "round for sheep", excavated the mound. However, this did not bring any archaeological finds.

Legend
According to legend, Wormy hillock henge was the location of a buried dragon or monster. In the legend, the dragon had been attacking villages in the neighbourhood, and the villagers eventually succeeded in killing the dragon. They then half-buried its corpse and mounded dirt over it, making a mound. This legend is the source of the names of the mound: Wormy Hillock Henge and The Dragon's Grave.

The site
The henge is located to the south of the mound known as Wormy Hillock, on a haugh ("a piece of flat alluvial land by the side of a river", according to the Oxford English Dictionary) in a steep valley in the Clashindarroch Forest. Wormy Hillock falls into the sub-category 'mini-henge' or 'hengiform' as it is less than 20m in diameter (see henge main article).

This site is similar to several others in Dorchester, Oxon, England. There are two small pits on the bank, and they may be much more recent than the rest of the mound. A large boulder is lying in the ditch right below one of the pits.

Currently, the site is completely overgrown by grass and heather.

Gallery

See also

Neolithic Europe
Scheduled Ancient Monument

References

External links
A picture of Wormy hillock henge showing the entrance through the bank

Archaeological sites in Aberdeenshire
Henges
Scheduled Ancient Monuments in Aberdeenshire